Lopez, officially the Municipality of Lopez,  is a 1st class municipality in the province of Quezon, Philippines. According to the 2020 census, it has a population of 94,657 people.

History

There was a flourishing coastal settlement somewhere in the southern part of the municipality of Gumaca called Talolong. The settlement's name was derived from the name of the river that traverses the place.

The original location of the settlement was in the marshy mouth of a sedate river, which was founded by the descendants of Datu Dumangsil and Datu Balinsusa of the Kalilayan kingdom. Due to the frequent plundering and terrorism of the pirates, the colony was transferred to the present town's location.

The settlement of Lakan Bugtali who founded the community of Gumaca was gone. Even a trace of its remains cannot be identified neither the vintages of the encomienda of Kalilayan nor a fraction of its 16th century glories. When it became a sitio through a papal bull, the village started to manage by her own.

In 1756, some people from the town of Mayoboc (present-day Pitogo) sought refuge in the sitio as they fled the Moro raid that burned the town to the ground. After sometime, some of them become discontented with the affairs of governing the sitio, went back to the original site of Mayoboc and again formed a settlement on an uphill portion, more suitable to guard against the Moro pirates. It later came to be known as Pitogo.

As the sitio became more organized and seen an increase in population, it formally became a full pledged town, separated from Gumaca, on June 30, 1857, during the Governorship of Alcalde Mayor Don Candido Lopez y Diaz. It later came to be known as the town of Lopez. The first gobernadorcillo was Don Antonio Olivarez.

Geography
Lopez is one of the largest municipalities in the province and has a total land area of 395.1 square kilometers representing 4.53% of the total land area of the province of Quezon.

Coastal areas deviate from plain to hilly terrains. Rivers, streams and springs abound throughout the municipality, but the most prominent is the Talolong River.

It is bordered by the municipalities of Catanauan and General Luna on the south, Macalelon on the south-west, Calauag on the north-east, Gumaca on the west, Buenavista and Guinayangan on the east.

Barangays
Lopez is politically subdivided into 95 barangays, 7 of which are urban and 88 are rural.

Climate

Demographics

Settlement areas in the municipality are highly scattered; population concentration is noticeable only within the poblacion, that is, the urban barangays of Burgos, Danlagan, Gomez, Magsaysay, Rizal, San Lorenzo Ruiz (Bocboc) and Talolong as well as the rural barangays of Mal-ay, Sugod, Pansol, Calantipayan, Manguisian, Del Pilar, Bebito, Canda Ibaba and Canda Ilaya which are traversed by the national highway. The rest of rural barangays are reached by other road networks which are accessible during dry and wet season. According to the 2007 census, it had a population of 86,660, a quarter of which are in the urban areas and the rest are in the rural areas. Males outnumbered the females at a ratio of 105.34 to 100. The population grew to 95,167 in the 2015 census.

Aldrin Ludovice Salipande (2022) reports that Inagta Lopenze is spoken in Villa Espina and nearby barangays in Lopez.

Religion
 Roman Catholic
 Seventh-Day Adventist
 Jehovah's Witnesses
 Baptist
 Latter day saints
 Church of God
 Evangelical
 Word for the World Christian Fellowship
 Iglesia Ni Cristo

Economy

Lopez had a labor force of 56.99% in 2000 or 44,849. About 9,474 of the employed labor force were engaged in primary industries such as farming and fishing.  Its economy is basically engaged in agriculture, crops, poultry and livestock production. Around 17,778.57 has. representing 45% of the total land area planted to coconut trees, 2,300 has. are established to rice production, 628 has. to corn harvest. Growing around are natural materials for handicraft such as wild vines, buri, anahaw, tikiw, bamboo, cogon and talahib. Several cottage industries exist in the locality such as bamboo furniture, bolo, baskets, rattan, anahaw and buri fan making, buntal and tikiw. It also has rich fishing grounds in the Lopez Bay area and a number of inland fishponds. Fish, shrimps, prawns, crabs and other sea products are abundant.

Rice is also a major staple crop, the municipality is also a major banana producer in the region. Other crops grown in the municipality are citrus, root crops, vegetables and industrial crops. Majority of the farmers are also raising livestock and poultry.

Government

Elected municipal officials 2016–2019:
 Mayor: Rachel Ubana
 Vice Mayor: Adeline Lee
 Councilors:
 Marie Olanda
 
 Arke Yulde
 Castor Alanao
 Willard Tabien
 Alex V. Vergara
 
 Edmundo Chan

Public services 

Number of Hospitals
Public - 1
Private - 2
Number of Private Health Clinics - 4
Number of Barangay Health Centers - 31
Number of Police Personnel - 79
Number of Fire Personnel - 18
Communication and Transportation Facilities
Number of Postal Offices - 2
Number of Mobile Phone Companies - 3
Number of Landline Phone Companies - 2
Number of Telegraph Stations - 2
Number of CATV Companies - 1
Number of FM Radio Stations - 2

Tourism

Feasts and festivals:
Patronal Town Fiesta, in honor of the town's patroness, Our Lady of the Most Holy Rosary - October 7
Pamaypay Festival Day, April 30 (also Kapistahan ng Pamahalaang Bayan, to establish a distinct feast day from the traditionally celebrated patronal feast day every 7th of October).
Foundation Day, June 30, 1857, when Sitio/Visita Talolong became a Town (Pueblo) independent and separate from Gumaca, Quezon (Tayabas)
Mayflower Festival, or the Flores de Maria, celebrated the whole month of May, culminating with a solemn procession around the poblacion, and on to the night of celebration in dance and songs of praise at the end of the month. The length of the annual procession is said to be one of the longest wherein the head of the line usually arrives back to the church just as the tail is leaving. 
Tibag Cave -  a man-made cave shelter dating back the 2nd World War. Said to be a hiding place of the guerrillas who fought the Japanese invaders. Located in Barangay Talolong.
Binutas Cave - also a man-made cave dating back the Japanese Occupation period. Used by the guerrillas as a tactical war maneuver point. Located in Barangay Matinik, just beside the PNR Railways.
Pulong Niyogan - an islet off the shore of Barangay Hondagua, noted for its unspoiled fine sand beach and varieties of corals and fish.
Pansol Floating Restaurants - Located at Barangay Pansol and can be accessed from the Maharlika Highway. Composed of several restaurants on floating bamboo rafts, these are popular getaway of many Lopenzes during vacations.
Gen. Gaudencio Vera's Monument - located in Barangay Lalaguna. Erected to commemorate the heroism and bravery of Gen. Gaudencio Vera during the Japanese period. He was the leader of the guerrilla faction called Vera's Guerrilla Party operating in the Southern Tagalog and Northern Bicol.

Sports
Lopez Sports Centre is noted for its cockfighting which is held every Sunday. In 2009 it was visited by Charley Boorman as part of By Any Means 2.

Education

Lopez is dubbed as the educational center of Southern Quezon. Several educational institutions operate in the town serving not only its citizens but also those coming from the Bondoc Peninsula and the Bicol Region.  Very notable among these are the Polytechnic University of the Philippines - Lopez, Philippine Normal University - South Luzon, Eastern Tayabas College and the Lopez National Comprehensive High School. The Quezon Provincial Training Center of the Technical Education and Skills Development Authority (TESDA) is also located in the town.  Lopez is also home to Laguna State Polytechnic University (LSPU) and Technological University of the Philippines (TUP) as the two state universities have started operating in the town starting in June 2012.  Furthermore, preparatory, primary and secondary education are no longer a problem since several schools have already opened their doors in the far-flung areas to serve the rural youth as part of town's mission of bringing the schools closer to the people.

Number of Preparatory Schools:
Public - 56
Private - 6
Number of Elementary Schools:
Public
West District - 27
East District - 34
Private - 5
Number of Secondary Schools:
Public - 13
Private - 5
Higher Education, Non-Formal and Technical Institutions
State Universities
Polytechnic University of the Philippines - Lopez
Philippine Normal University - South Luzon
Technological University of the Philippines
Laguna State Polytechnic University
Private College
Eastern Tayabas College
Non-Formal Education Schools
Mission Care International School of Caregiver
Technical Schools
ACEBA Systems Technology Institute
TESDA - Quezon Provincial Training Center

References

External links

Lopez Profile at PhilAtlas.com

[ Philippine Standard Geographic Code]
Philippine Census Information
Local Governance Performance Management System

Municipalities of Quezon